The Oxford Faculty of Theology and Religion co-ordinates the teaching of theology at the University of Oxford, England. It is part of Oxford's Humanities Division.

The Theology Faculty Centre was at 34 St Giles' in central Oxford. It is now on the second floor of the Gibson Building in the Radcliffe Observatory Quarter on Woodstock Road.

History 
One of the first series of lectures delivered at Oxford University was on theology.  As early as 1193, Alexander Neckam from St Albans gave biblical and moral lectures on the Psalms of David and the Wisdom of Solomon. One of the first university buildings was the Divinity School, begun in 1423 specifically for theology lectures.

The modern theological faculty emerges during the reform of the University of Oxford in the nineteenth century. The Final Honour School of Theology -  as a route to the Bachelor of Arts degree - was introduced in 1869. Up until then, theological study was the reserve of graduates and those seeking ordination in the Church of England, who would attend a short series of lectures by the Regius Professors on basic divinity; its focus was on the Thirty-Nine Articles, Joseph Butler's Analogy of Religion and a knowledge of the Greek New Testament. Although an honour school in theology was recommended from as early as 1853, it was not until the late 1860s, amidst concerns about the declining influence of the Established Church in the university, that Edward Pusey and Henry Parry Liddon began to advocate the introduction of a separate School of Theology responsible for the training of Anglican ordinands. Its curriculum was biblical and historical in its focus, with its first examinations requiring knowledge of scripture, ecclesiastical history and patristics, dogmatic and symbolic theology, apologetics, liturgy and sacred criticism.

The faculty remained as a stronghold of the Church of England well into the 20th century, with denominational restrictions on the higher theological degrees (the Bachelor of Divinity and the Doctor of Divinity) and examiners in the Final Honour School of Theology only being abolished in 1920 and 1922 respectively. Still, three of the regius professorships are tied to canonries at Christ Church Cathedral, requiring their holders to be in ordained in the Church of England or in a church in communion with the Church of England. A  significant proportion of the faculty's students are preparing for ordination, either as candidates for the B.A. or the B.Th.

Despite the faculty's historic obligations to the Church of England, the foundation of Nonconformist and Roman Catholic institutions in Oxford from the late 19th century onwards, alongside changing academic and ecclesiastical attitudes towards theological study, resulted in the gradual transformation of theology from a purely professional discipline into an aspect of humanistic study.

During the 20th century, Oxford established itself as an internationally significant centre of theological study with important contributions from S. R. Driver, William Sanday, C. H. Turner, B. H. Streeter, N. P. Williams, R. H. Lightfoot, G. R. Driver, Austin Farrer, Maurice Wiles, Henry Chadwick, James Barr and Arthur Peacocke. Although the department has, more recently, introduced examination papers in modern systematic theology, world religions and even separate postgraduate master's degrees in the study of religion, the Final Honour School of Theology remains primarily focused on biblical and historical study. Each undergraduate devotes at least half of his or her degree to the study of the Old Testament, New Testament, the development of Christian doctrine to AD 451 and modern Christian doctrine. Candidates can then choose four further papers from a wide selection of topics in biblical studies, history, doctrine and world religions.

Professors

Statutory professorships

The following statutory professorships are held in conjunction with a canonry of Christ Church: the professor must be ordained in priest’s orders in the Church of England or in an Anglican church in communion with the Church of England, or eligible for and prepared to accept ordination.

Regius Professor of Divinity - The Reverend Canon Graham Ward
Lady Margaret Professor of Divinity - Canon Carol Harrison 
Regius Professor of Moral and Pastoral Theology - The Reverend Canon Nigel Biggar

The following statutory professorship is held in conjunction with a canonry of Christ Church: the professor must be ordained in priest’s orders in the Church of England or in an episcopal church in communion with the Church of England, or eligible for and prepared to accept ordination; alternatively, in accordance the Church of England (Miscellaneous Provisions) Measure 1995 §2, the professorship may be held in conjunction with a lay canonry: the professor must be a lay member of the Church of England, or of any church in communion with it, or a minister or lay member of a church not in communion with the Church of England provided he or she is a suitably qualified member of one of the churches to which the Church of England (Ecumenical Relations) Measure 1988 refers.

Regius Professor of Ecclesiastical History - The Reverend Canon Sarah Foot
Oriel and Laing Professor of the Interpretation of Holy Scripture (attached to a fellowship at Oriel) - Hindy Najman
Dean Ireland's Professor of the Exegesis of Holy Scripture (attached to a fellowship at Keble) - Markus Bockmuehl
Nolloth Professor of the Philosophy of the Christian Religion (attached to a fellowship at Oriel) - Brian Leftow
Andreas Idreos Professor of Science and Religion (attached to a fellowship at Harris Manchester) - The Reverend Alister McGrath (formerly Peter Harrison)
Professor of the Study of the Abrahamic Religions (attached to a fellowship at Lady Margaret Hall - Anna Abulafia (from 1 April 2015)

Other professors

 John Day: Professor of Old Testament Studies (fellow of Lady Margaret Hall)
 The Reverend Paul Fiddes: Professor of Systematic Theology (principal emeritus and professorial research fellow of Regent's Park)
 Susan Gillingham: Professor of the Hebrew Bible (fellow of Worcester College)
 Martin Goodman: Professor of Jewish Studies (fellow of Wolfson)
 Diarmaid MacCulloch: Professor of the History of the Church (fellow of St Cross)
 The Reverend Christopher Tuckett: Professor of New Testament Studies (fellow of Pembroke)

See also
 Divinity School, Oxford

References

Further reading 
 Daniel D. Inman, The Making of Modern English Theology: God and the Academy at Oxford, 1833-1945, Minneapolis, 2014.

External links
 Faculty of Theology website
 QAA Report

Christianity studies
Teology Faculty
Christian seminaries and theological colleges